Lekhapani is a town in Tinsukia district, Assam, India.

and it is also the last frontier of North Frontier Railway(but it is inoperative since 1993)Lekhapani railway station

Geography
It is located at an elevation of 150 m above MSL.

Transport
Lekhapani is connected by National Highway 38 to Makum. National Highway 153 which connects Ledo to Indo-Myanmar border across Pangsau Pass passes through Lekhapani. Lekhapani railway station is a defunct one but surveys are on to extend the line to Kharsang and revive the station.

Nearest towns and villages 
 Tirap Gaon
 Ledo, Assam
 Margherita
 Tipong

References

Tinsukia district